Dragonfly is a South Korean video game developer and publisher based in Seoul. While a small company, it is notable for releasing many popular games both in Korea and globally including Special Force and Karma and still continue to release games both domestically and abroad. Besides video games, the company has also branched into other industries including biotechnology and webtoon publishing.

Games

PC games
 Karma
 Valpurgis Night

Online games
 Karma Online
 Special Force
 Special Force 2
 Karma 2
 Soldier of Fortune Online
 Quake Wars Online

References

External links 
 Official website

Video game development companies
Video game publishers
Video game companies of South Korea
Video game companies established in 1995
1995 establishments in South Korea